Calheta may refer to the following places:

Cape Verde
Calheta, Cape Verde, a village on the island of Maio
Calheta de São Miguel, Cape Verde, a village on the island of Santiago

Portugal
In the archipelago of the Azores:
Calheta (Azores), a municipality  on the island of São Jorge
Calheta, a civil parish in the municipality of Calheta
Calhetas, a civil parish in the municipality of Ribeira Grande, island of São Miguel
Calheta de Nesquim, a civil parish in the municipality of Lajes do Pico, island of Pico

In the archipelago of Madeira:
Calheta, Madeira, municipality on the island of Madeira
Arco da Calheta, a civil parish in the municipality of Calheta
Calheta, a civil parish in the municipality of Calheta
Estreito da Calheta, a civil parish in the municipality of Calheta